The Victims of Communism Memorial Foundation (VOC) is a non-profit anti-communist organization in the United States, authorized by a unanimous Act of Congress in 1993 for the purpose of "educating Americans about the ideology, history and legacy of communism."

The organization was responsible for building the Victims of Communism Memorial in Washington, D.C. It is a member of the European Union's Platform of European Memory and Conscience.

History 
In 1991, Republican Senator Steve Symms and Representative Dana Rohrabacher introduced concurrent resolutions in the United States Congress urging the construction of "an International Memorial to the Victims of Communism at an appropriate location within the boundaries of the District of Columbia and for the appointment of a commission to oversee the design, construction and all other pertinent details of the memorial."

In 1993, Rohrabacher and fellow Republican Senator Jesse Helms sponsored amendments to the FRIENDSHIP Act of 1993 which authorized such construction. The act was signed into law by Democratic President Bill Clinton on December 17, 1993. It cited "the deaths of over 100,000,000 victims in an unprecedented imperial holocaust" and resolved that "the sacrifices of these victims should be permanently memorialized so that never again will nations and peoples allow so evil a tyranny to terrorize the world."

According to Title IX, Section 905 of Public Law 103–199, an independent organization was to be established to construct, maintain, and operate the Victims of Communism Memorial in Washington, D.C., as well as to collect the contributions for the establishment of the memorial and to encourage the participation of all groups suffered under Communist regimes. In 2007, the foundation completed the Victims of Communism Memorial, which was dedicated by Republican President George W. Bush. In 2016, the foundation released a list of 51 prisoners of conscience in Cuba just before Democratic President Barack Obama visit and meeting with Cuban leader Raúl Castro. In 2020, the organization released a report alleging organ harvesting from Falun Gong practitioners and Uyghurs in China.

Programs

Victims of Communism Memorial 
The memorial was dedicated on June 12, 2007, the 20th anniversary of Republican President Ronald Reagan's "Tear down this wall" speech in Berlin. The unveiling of the statue in Washington DC earned international press attention.

The land was a gift of the National Park Service, and the remaining cost, over $1 million, was raised from private sources. Sculpted by Thomas Marsh, it is a 10-foot bronze replica of the Papier-mâché Goddess of Democracy statue made by student democracy protesters leading up to the Tiananmen Square massacre in 1989.

Museum 
The foundation aims to build a museum in Washington, D.C. The foundation is working on a proposed budget for a museum near the National Mall, and has received a $1 million grant toward the museum from the government of Hungary. Plans for the museum include exhibit space, an auditorium, archives, and resident scholars. The museum opened on June 13, 2022.

Truman-Reagan Medal of Freedom 
The foundation annually presents its Truman-Reagan Medal of Freedom at an event which honors opponents of communism and has been used to raise funds for the construction of the memorial. Past recipients include Myroslav Marynovych, Chen Guangcheng, Tom Lantos, Pope John Paul II, Vaclav Havel, Yang Jianli, Thadeus Nguyễn Văn Lý, Yelena Bonner, William F. Buckley Jr., Richard Pipes, Guillermo Fariñas, Lane Kirkland, Armando Valladares, János Horváth, Lech Wałęsa, Anna Walentynowicz, National Endowment for Democracy, and Henry M. Jackson.

Projects 
In 2015, the foundation released a biopic video series called Witness Project, featuring interviews with witnesses of communism. Other projects include national seminars for high-school teachers and for college campuses.

Lobbying 
The foundation opposed the Foreign Cultural Exchange Jurisdictional Immunity Clarification Act on the grounds that it would protect unlawfully acquired artwork held by  Russian museums.

People 

VOC's chairman is Edwin Feulner, founder and former president of the American conservative think tank The Heritage Foundation. Its chairman emeritus and co-founder is scholar Lee Edwards, a founding member of the conservative youth activism organization Young Americans for Freedom and distinguished fellow at The Heritage Foundation. Lev Dobriansky, economics professor and chairman of the anti-communist National Captive Nations Committee, previously served as chairman emeritus. 

Jay K. Katzen, former Republican member of the Virginia House of Delegates, was the foundation's president from June 2003 until his death in April 2020. Andrew Bremberg, former department manager for federally funded not-for-profit defence research contractor MITRE and former director of the Domestic Policy Council for U.S. President Donald Trump, was appointed as president and CEO on 30 Mar 2021.

The national advisory council includes Dennis DeConcini, John Earl Haynes, and George Weigel. Former or deceased members include Robert Conquest, Richard Pipes, Rudolph Rummel, Jack Kemp, Paul Hollander, and John K. Singlaub. The international advisory council includes Sali Berisha, Emil Constantinescu, Mart Laar, Vytautas Landsbergis, Guntis Ulmanis, Armando Valladares, and Lech Walesa. Former members include Yelena Bonner, Vladimir Bukovsky, Brian Crozier, Árpád Göncz, and Václav Havel.

Reception 
According to Kristen Ghodsee and Scott Sehon, the estimate of 100 million dead favored by the organization is dubious, as their source for this is the introduction to The Black Book of Communism by Stéphane Courtois which has attracted praise but also criticism from historians. Ghodsee and Sehon write that while "quibbling about numbers is unseemly. What matters is that many, many people were killed by communist regimes." Ghodsee posits that the foundation, along with counterpart conservative and anti-communist organizations in Eastern Europe, seeks to institutionalize the "Victims of Communism" narrative with the controversial double genocide theory, or the alleged moral equivalence between the Nazi Holocaust and mass killings by Communist regimes.

See also 
 Memorial (society)
 Museum of Communism, Czech Republic
 Museum of Communism, Warsaw
 Virtual Museum of Soviet Repression in Belarus

References

Further reading

External links 
 

1994 establishments in Washington, D.C.
Anti-communist organizations in the United States
Civic and political organizations of the United States
Commemoration of communist crimes
Educational foundations in the United States
Foundations based in Washington, D.C.
Organizations established in 1994